Blonde strawberry is a 1980 Italian film directed by Mino Bellei. It is Bellei's only film as a director.

Plot

For a long time, Antonio and the pharmacist Domenico live in harmony in the same apartment. The two lovers share the fees of the house.

Once a time, Antonio has been thinking about something else and announces to Domenico that he has made a new friend: is Adriano Velluto, a photo model, also linked to Mathilde. Domenico pretends to tolerate the threesome, but there are many surprises.

Cast
 Mino Bellei: Domenico Condo
 Umberto Orsini: Antonio
 Gianni Felici: Adriano Velluto
 Renato Scarpa: the psychoanalyst
 Annamaria Romoli

References

External links

1980 films
1980 drama films
1980s Italian-language films
Films set in 1980
Films set in Italy
Italian drama films
1980s Italian films
Italian LGBT-related films